Obradoiro Clube de Amigos do Baloncesto  (lit, Obradoiro Friends of Basketball Club), also known as Monbus Obradoiro for sponsorship reasons, is a professional basketball team based in Santiago de Compostela, Galicia. They currently compete in the ACB League.

History 

Obradoiro CAB was founded in 1970 and started playing in the third division after acquiring the spot of the basketball section of SD Compostela. They were promoted for the first time to the Liga Nacional after finishing in the third position of the 1981–82 Primera División B.

Obradoiro played only the 1982–83 season in the top flight, where it only achieved two wins in 26 games.

2009–10 was its returning season to the Spanish top division, Liga ACB, after the Supreme Court conceded that the Júver Murcia committed improper alignment in a matchup in the 1990 promotion playoff. A horrible second half of the league, with only one win in 17 matches, caused the relegation to LEB Oro, the second division of Spanish basketball.

In the next season, Obradoiro came back to Liga ACB as runner-up of the 2010–11 LEB Oro season and also won its first national title: the Copa Príncipe de Asturias.

The 2012–13 ACB season was the best one in the history of the club. Obradoiro CAB finished the regular season in the eight position and joined the playoffs, where it was eliminated in the quarterfinals by the champion Real Madrid.

Sponsorship naming 

Feiraco Obradoiro: During '70s and '80s
Óptica Val Obradoiro: until 2009
Xacobeo Blu:sens: 2009–2010
Blu:sens Monbus: 2010–2013
Rio Natura Monbus: 2013–2014
Rio Natura Monbus Obradoiro: 2014–2017
Monbus Obradoiro: 2017–present

Players

Retired numbers 
4 Bernard Hopkins, F, 2010–2012
15 Oriol Junyent, C, 2009, 2010–2014

Current roster

Depth chart

Head coaches 
Managers since joining the ACB:
Curro Segura 2009–2010
Moncho Fernández 2010–present

Season by season

Home arenas 
 University Gymnasium (1970–76).
 Pabellón Brañas do Sar (1976–1990).
 Polideportivo Lorenzo da Torre (1990–2009).
 Pabellón Multiusos Fontes do Sar (2009–present).

Notable former players 

 Jake Cohen
 Nihad Đedović
 Kostas Vasileiadis
 Salah Mejri
 Rosco Allen
 Alec Brown
 Paul Davis
 Robbie Hummel
 Marc Jackson
 Mike Muscala
 Maxi Kleber
 Laurynas Beliauskas
 Eimantas Bendžius
 Laurynas Birutis
 Deividas Dulkys
 Tryggvi Hlinason

Trophies and awards

Trophies 
Copa Príncipe de Asturias: (1)
2011
Copa Galicia: (9)
2010, 2011, 2012, 2013, 2014, 2015, 2016, 2017, 2019

Individual awards 
ACB Rising Star Award
Salah Mejri – 2013

References

External links 
  
 Eurobasket.com Team Profile

Basketball teams in Galicia (Spain)
Basketball teams established in 1970
Liga ACB teams
Former LEB Oro teams
Sport in Santiago de Compostela